The Redeeming Sin (1929) is a crime drama part-talking silent film with Vitaphone music and sound effects. It was produced and distributed by Warner Bros. and stars Dolores Costello. This film is a lost film.

This film is a remake of a 1925 Vitagraph film The Redeeming Sin starring Nazimova.

Cast
Dolores Costello as Joan Billaire
Conrad Nagel as Dr. Raoul de Boise
George E. Stone as A sewer rat
Philippe De Lacy as Petit
Lionel Belmore as Father Colomb
Warner Richmond as Lupine
Nina Quartero as Mitzi

References

External links

period lobby poster to The Redeeming Sin

1929 films
American silent feature films
Films directed by Howard Bretherton
Lost American films
Transitional sound films
American crime drama films
American black-and-white films
Films scored by Louis Silvers
1929 lost films
1920s American films
Silent American drama films